Muhammad Iqbal Wazir is a Pakistani politician who was a member of the Provincial Assembly of Khyber Pakhtunkhwa from August 2019 to January 2023.

Political career
Wazir contested 2019 Khyber Pakhtunkhwa provincial election on 20 July 2019 from constituency PK-111 (North Waziristan-I) on the ticket of Pakistan Tehreek-e-Insaf. He won the election by the majority of 912 votes over the runner up Maulana Samiuddin of Jamiat Ulema-e-Islam. He garnered 10,200 votes while Samiuddin received 9,288 votes.

References

Living people
Pakistan Tehreek-e-Insaf MPAs (Khyber Pakhtunkhwa)
Politicians from Khyber Pakhtunkhwa
Year of birth missing (living people)